Bengt Gingsjö (15 April 1952 – 14 September 2022) was a Swedish freestyle and medley swimmer, who competed in the 1972 Summer Olympics and 1976 Summer Olympics.  He finished fourth on the 1500m freestyle in 1972. Gingsjö also won a bronze medal in the 400 m freestyle at the first FINA World Aquatics Championships in 1973.

Clubs
Simavdelningen 1902

References

1952 births
2022 deaths
Swedish male medley swimmers
Swimmers at the 1972 Summer Olympics
Swimmers at the 1976 Summer Olympics
Olympic swimmers of Sweden
Swimmers from Gothenburg
World Aquatics Championships medalists in swimming
European Aquatics Championships medalists in swimming
Simavdelningen 1902 swimmers
Swedish male freestyle swimmers
20th-century Swedish people
21st-century Swedish people